Jerauld County is a county in the U.S. state of South Dakota. As of the 2020 census, the population was 1,663. Its county seat is Wessington Springs.

History
In 1873, the area occupied by the present Jerauld county was organized into Wetmore County. In 1881, Wetmore and its neighbor county to the south, Cragin County, were combined to form Aurora County. In 1883, the area of the former Wetmore County was reincorporated as present-day Jerauld County.

It was named for H. J. Jerauld, a legislator.

Geography
The terrain of Jerauld County consists of low rolling hills, mostly devoted to agriculture. The terrain slopes to the south and east, with the county's highest point on the west boundary line near its NW corner, at 1,932' (589m) ASL.

Major highways
 U.S. Highway 281
 South Dakota Highway 34
 South Dakota Highway 224

Adjacent counties

 Beadle County - northeast
 Sanborn County - east
 Aurora County - south
 Brule County - southwest
 Buffalo County - west
 Hand County - northwest

Protected areas
 Crow Lake State Game Production Area
 Horseshoe Lake State Game Production Area

Lakes

 Bakers Lake
 Cottonwood Lake
 Horseshoe Lake
 Long Lake
 Rempter Lake
 Twin Lakes (partial)

Demographics

2000 census
As of the 2000 United States Census, there were 2,295 people, 987 households, and 651 families in the county. The population density was 4 people per square mile (2/km2). There were 1,167 housing units at an average density of 2 per square mile (1/km2). The racial makeup of the county was 99.00% White, 0.57% Native American, 0.13% Asian, and 0.31% from two or more races. 0.31% of the population were Hispanic or Latino of any race.

There were 987 households, out of which 24.30% had children under the age of 18 living with them, 56.40% were married couples living together, 6.30% had a female householder with no husband present, and 34.00% were non-families. 31.30% of all households were made up of individuals, and 17.70% had someone living alone who was 65 years of age or older. The average household size was 2.28 and the average family size was 2.85.

The county population contained 21.40% under the age of 18, 6.90% from 18 to 24, 19.80% from 25 to 44, 26.20% from 45 to 64, and 25.60% who were 65 years of age or older. The median age was 46 years. For every 100 females there were 98.40 males. For every 100 females age 18 and over, there were 96.00 males.

The median income for a household in the county was $30,690, and the median income for a family was $36,076. Males had a median income of $24,583 versus $17,500 for females. The per capita income for the county was $16,856. About 15.20% of families and 20.60% of the population were below the poverty line, including 30.90% of those under age 18 and 8.30% of those age 65 or over.

2010 census
As of the 2010 United States Census, there were 2,071 people, 870 households, and 564 families residing in the county. The racial makeup of the county was 97.0% white, 0.2% Asian, 0.2% American Indian, 0.1% Pacific islander, 1.6% from other races, and 0.7% from two or more races. Those of Hispanic or Latino origin made up 4.1% of the population. In terms of ancestry, 50.6% were German, 17.7% were Norwegian, 11.6% were English, 6.8% were Irish, 5.3% were Swedish, and 2.2% were American.

Of the 870 households, 20.2% had children under the age of 18 living with them, 55.1% were married couples living together, 6.2% had a female householder with no husband present, 35.2% were non-families, and 30.9% of all households were made up of individuals. The average household size was 2.18 and the average family size was 2.70. The median age was 48.6 years.

The median income for a household in the county was $40,607 and the median income for a family was $44,717. Males had a median income of $32,017 versus $20,505 for females. The per capita income for the county was $24,942. About 10.2% of families and 10.9% of the population were below the poverty line, including 13.3% of those under age 18 and 12.9% of those age 65 or over.

Politics
In the 2008 US presidential election, Republican John McCain won Jerauld County over Democrat Barack Obama by four votes. It was the closest county result in the country in the 2008 election. Jerauld County voters have tended to vote Republican; since 1960 the county has chosen the Republican Party candidate in 71% of national elections.

Media
The county is served by the True Dakotan weekly newspaper.

Communities

City
 Wessington Springs (county seat)

Towns
 Alpena
 Lane

Census-designated place 

 Spring Valley Colony

Unincorporated communities
 Crow Lake
 Dale

Townships

Alpena
Anina
Blaine
Chery
Crow
Crow Lake
Franklin
Harmony
Logan
Marlar
Media
Pleasant
Viola
Wessington Springs

Unorganized territory
 Dale

See also
 National Register of Historic Places listings in Jerauld County, South Dakota

References

External links
  NACO Jerauld County - County government information from NACO

 
1883 establishments in Dakota Territory
Populated places established in 1883